The 1981 Davis Cup (also known as the 1981 Davis Cup by NEC for sponsorship purposes) was the 70th edition of the Davis Cup, the most important tournament between national teams in men's tennis. 53 teams would enter the competition, 16 in the World Group, 23 in the Europe Zone, 8 in the Americas Zone, and 6 in the Eastern Zone.

The United States defeated Argentina in the final, held at the Riverfront Coliseum in Cincinnati, Ohio, United States on 11–13 December, to win their 27th title overall.

Format changes
The 1981 tournament marked the introduction of the 16-team World Group and a move to a tiered system including promotion and relegation. The original 16 teams to compete were chosen through the previous year's results, with teams that reached the Zonal semifinals chosen to compete in the inaugural bracket. Teams which lost in the World Group first round would now compete against each other in the World Group Relegation Play-off, with the four losers relegated to their respective Zonal competition the following year. The four winners of the Zonal competitions would now earn promotion into the following year's World Group to replace the relegated teams.

The 16 qualifying teams for the first World Group were: from the 1980 Americas Zone, the North & Central America Zone finalists the United States and Mexico, and the South America Zone finalists Argentina and Brazil; the 1980 Eastern Zone semifinalists Australia, Japan, New Zealand and South Korea; and the semifinalists from the two Europe Zones Czechoslovakia, Great Britain, France, Italy, Romania, Sweden, Switzerland and West Germany.

This year also marked the first year of commercial sponsorship, when Japanese electronics company NEC became the tournament's first Title Sponsor, a partnership that lasted 21 years in total. NEC's partnership also enabled prize money to be given for the first time, with the World Group team competing for a total of US$1 million.

World Group

Draw

Final
United States vs. Argentina

Relegation play-offs

Date: 2–4 October

Americas Zone

  are promoted to the World Group in 1982.

Eastern Zone

  are promoted to the World Group in 1982.

Europe Zone

Zone A

  are promoted to the World Group in 1982.

Zone B

  are promoted to the World Group in 1982.

References
General

Specific

External links
Davis Cup Official Website

 
Davis Cups by year
Davis Cup
Davis Cup